Albert Modeste Émile François Simon Fichefet (born 22 June 1903, date of death unknown) was a Belgian sports shooter. He competed in the trap event at the 1952 Summer Olympics.

References

External links
 

1903 births
Year of death missing
Belgian male sport shooters
Olympic shooters of Belgium
Shooters at the 1952 Summer Olympics
Place of birth missing